Aja is a Central Sudanic language spoken in the southern South Sudanese province of Bahr el Ghazal and along the South Sudanese border in the Central African Republic.  Although the Aja are ethnically Kresh, their language is unintelligible to other Kresh languages. It is largely Banda in vocabulary, though it remains Kresh in structure. Most members of the tribe are bilingual in Kresh.  Alternate spellings are Adja and Ajja.

References

Central Sudanic languages
Languages of South Sudan
Languages of the Central African Republic
Kresh languages